"Sorry But I" is a song and the first single by South Korean girl group C-REAL. The single was released on May 16, 2012. The song has been in the upper ranks of the charts since it was released, and it finally ranked 8th on Melon’s real-time chart. It attracted attention as it entered the top ten with the songs of IU, Baek Ji-young, Girls' Generation-TTS, Sistar, Ulala Session, Park Jin-young, and Busker Busker.

Background
The song was produced by the same producer, Choi Kap Won and was also written by him. The music and arrangement were done by Kim Se Jin and Seo Jung Jin.

Music video
A teaser was first revealed on May 13, 2012 before the full music video was uploaded on May 15, 2012. The music video was directed by Moon Seung Jae, who also produced the MVs of Sistar, DJ DOC, V.O.S and more.

The video starts with Ann J in a swing with a guy behind her, putting a headphone on her ears. The guy then stopped moving and Ann J stood up, putting the headphone out of her head. She started walking slowly, leaving the guy. The scene was the same with the other members, but with a different guy and place. Effie left the boy sitting on the bench with the guitar. Lenny was shown lying her head on the guy's lap, in a scene in which they seems like having a picnic. She stood up, leaving the guy. Chemi then left the boy holding an ice cream that was supposed to wipe something on her face. Re Dee left right after she and a guy hugged.

Throughout the music video, they were walking on the streets, until the five of them ended up walking together. In the end they saw a sign that says "DEAD END ROAD, NO TURN AROUND". They then goes back to the guys that they left and they started moving once again.

Track listing

Charts

References

External links
LOEN Entertainment official YouTube account
NAP Entertainment official site 

2012 singles
South Korean songs
Korean-language songs
2012 songs